is a Japanese musician and actor from Itabashi, Tokyo. Inagaki was a member of the Japanese pop group SMAP. A year after the group's dissolution, Inagaki, alongside his former bandmates Tsuyoshi Kusanagi and Shingo Katori formed the group Atarashii Chizu.

His international film debut was in the romantic comedy Private Lessons II, playing the male lead role of a Japanese student who falls for his tutor. Private Lessons II also starred SMAP leader Masahiro Nakai.

Filmography

Drama
 1989: Seishun Kazoku (1989) as Daichi Agawa
 1991: Gakkō e ikō as Toru Fujii 
 1992: Hatachi no Yakusoku as Akagi Junpei
 1993: Uso Demo li Kara as Nogami Fumiya
 1994: Tokyo Daigaku Monogatari as Naoki Murakami
 1995: Saikō no Koibito as Michio Yoshinaga
 1996: Subarashiki Kazokuryokō as Kikuchi Tadahiro
 1997: Kare as Okamoto Toshiya
 1997: Koi no Katamichikippu as Mori Shinichi
 1998: Sommelier as Joe Satake
 1998: A Strange Story (Autumn Special Edition) as Akira Bessho
 1999: Kiken na Kankei as Takao Kawase
 2000: Saimin as Saga Toshiya
 2001: Onmyōji as Abeno Awimwi
 2002: Kekkon no Jyōken as Kaoru Kurashima
 2002: Yoisho no Otoko as Sakurai Kotaro
 2002: Ren'ai Hensachi as Yusaku Natsume
 2004: Hoshi ni Negai o as Shuta Okamoto
 2004: Inugamike no Ichizoku (The Kindaichi Series) as Kousuke Kindaichi
 2004: 9.11 as Yoichi Sugiyama
 2004: Yatsuhakamura (The Kindaichi Series) as Kousuke Kindaichi
 2005: M no Higeki as Ando Mamoru
 2005: Asuka e soshite madaminukoe as Sawamura Seiji
 2006: Jōōbachi (The Kindaichi Series) as Kindaichi Kosuke
 2006: Busu no Hitomi ni Koishiteru as Yamaguchi Osamu
 2007: Aakuma ga Kitarite Fue o Fuku (The Kindaichi Series) as Kindaichi Kosuke
 2007: Hanazakari no Kimitachi e as Kitahama Noburo (ep. 9)
 2008: Sasaki Fusai no Jinginaki Tatakai as Sasaki Norimichi
 2009: Akuma no Temariuta (The Kindaichi Series)  Kindaichi Kosuke
 2009: Kamen Rider G as Goro
 2009: Triangle as Kuroki Shun
 2010: Nagareboshi as Shûichi Makihara
 2011: Bull Doctor as Nakura Junnosuke
 2012: Hungry! as Aso Tokio
 2012: Dr. Kenzi as Masashi Morohashi
 2013: Take Five: Oretachi wa ai o nusumeruka as Kai Iwatsuki
 2013-2014: A Chef of Nobunaga as Akechi Mitsuhide
 2016: Fukigen na Kajitsu as Koichi Mizukoshi
 2019: Scarlet as Osaki Shigeyoshi

Movies
 1990: Saraba itoshino yakuza as Takashi Takanashi
 1993: Private Lessons II as Ken Soto
 1994: Shoot! as Umahori
 1996: Super Scandal as Toshiya Ota 
 1997: Parasite Eve as Tatsuro Ohno
 1999: Hypnosis as Toshiya Saga
 2004: University of Laughs as Hajime Tsubaki
 2006: One Piece: The Giant Mechanical Soldier of Karakuri Castle as Ratchet
 2007: Hokkyoku no Nanu (Japanese dub of Arctic Tale) as narrator
 2010: Thirteen Assassins as Matsudaira Naritsugu
 2016: Night's Tightrope Takao/Uncle
 2018: Kuso-yarō to Utsukushiki Sekai as Goro
 2019: Another World as Hiroshi Takamura
 2019: Tezuka's Barbara as Yosuke Mikura
 2019: Children of the Sea as Azumi Masaaki
 2020: Labyrinth of Cinema as Ōkubo Toshimichi
 2022: At the Window as Ichikawa Shigemi
 2023: Seiyoku as Hiroki Terai

TV Shows
 1992-1995: Yume ga Mori Mori as himself
 1996-1997: WIN (1996–1997) as host
 1996-2006: SMAP×SMAP as host
 1999: Honto ni Atta Kowai Hanashi as Tateyama Michitaka
 2000: Inagaki Geijutsukan
 2001-2017: SmaSTATION!! as host
 2002: Tokumei Research 200X: II as Tôru Date
 2003-2010 Wasurebumi as host
 2004: Goro no Sonata as host
 2004: Goro no Hosomichi as host
 2004-2009: Goro's Bar as host
 2009-2010: Goro's Bar Presents my Fair Lady as host
 2010: G.I. Goro as host
 2010-2011: Aishuutantei 1756 as host
 2011-2019: Goro Deluxe as host

References

External links
 

1973 births
Japanese male film actors
Japanese male television actors
Japanese idols
Japanese pop singers
Living people
Male actors from Tokyo
Singers from Tokyo
SMAP members
20th-century Japanese male actors
20th-century Japanese male singers
20th-century Japanese singers
21st-century Japanese male actors
21st-century Japanese male singers
21st-century Japanese singers
Horikoshi High School alumni